The Quartermaster-General of the Swedish Army (genint) was a general officer who was responsible for the Swedish Army Quartermaster Corps, the quartermaster branch of the Swedish Army.

History
In Sweden, the Quartermaster General was the highest commander of an army's commissariat service; between 1796 and 1814 it was the name of the chief of the General War Commissariat (Generalkrigskommissariatet), and between 1850 and 1865 the name of the chief of the Commissary Department in the War Collegium (Krigskollegium), and finally from 1865 the name of the chief of the Royal Swedish Army Materiel Administration's Quartermaster Department (from 1880 also head of the Swedish Army Quartermaster Corps). The Quartermaster General was responsible for the army's clothing and provisioning, maintenance and remounting, in war also for the General Staff's finances and the accounting thereof.

The Quartermaster General, who commanded the Swedish Army Quartermaster Corps, also commanded the Royal Swedish Army Materiel Administration's Quartermasters Department and he was also, from 1914, the Inspector of the Quartermaster Service Troops (Intendenturtrupperna, Int) and regarding the training of these troops, he had similar duties as other branch inspectors. In his capacity as head of the Swedish Army Quartermaster Corps and Inspector of the Quartermaster Service Troops, he was assisted most closely by personnel of the Quartermaster Staff (Intendenturstaben).

In the Swedish Navy, in 1789, a Quartermaster General was appointed, in whose hand the entire economic board rested. The office was abolished in 1794.

Quartermasters General

Footnotes

References

Notes

Print

Military appointments of Sweden
Quartermasters